The 2005–06 season was Blackpool F.C.'s 98th season (95th consecutive) in the Football League. It was also their fifth consecutive season in the third tier of English football. They finished in nineteenth place.

Colin Hendry was succeeded by Simon Grayson as caretaker manager in November 2005.

Keigan Parker was the club's top scorer, with thirteen goals (twelve in the league and one in the League Cup).

Competitions

Overall record

Football League One

League table

Results

In summary

By matchday

In detail

FA Cup

Football League Cup

Football League Trophy

Squad statistics

Appearances and goals

Players used: 38
Goals scored: 64 (including 2 own goals)

Goalscorers

Clean sheets

Disciplinary record

Transfers

Transfers in

Loans in

Transfers out

Loans out

References

General
Books

Websites

Specific

Blackpool F.C. seasons
Blackpool